Vachagan Khalatyan (11 May 1932 — 22 July 2004) is a Deaf educator, PhD, originator of Armenian manual alphabet.

Biography

Early life and career 

Vachagan Khalatyan was born in Urut. Receiving a village school education and later on, a high school education in Stepanavan, he moved to Yerevan. In 1949-54 Vachagan successfully graduated from the Yerevan State Linguistic University named after Valery Brusov (YSLU), department  of  French Language and Literature. In 1954 Khalatyan was drafted into the Soviet Army. In 1958 Vachagan started working at boarding school  for deaf and dumb children in Yerevan as a teacher of Armenian language and as a paraprofessional educator providing more intensive instructional sessions in a resource room. In 1959-61 Vachagan graduated from the Moscow State Pedagogical University (1959–61)/distance learning/, the faculty of Deaf education and became the first deaf educator in Armenia.

Contribution to deaf education 

In 1961 Vachagan Khalatyan created the Armenian Manual Alphabet.  Afterwards he initiated and established a boarding school for hearing- impaired children in Yerevan (1967). He led it for more than 20 years, while teaching and doing research. In 1983 Vachagan received his PhD in Education from the Moscow State Pedagogical University. Since then his main focus has been on issues related to deaf education, training for scholarly scientific and pedagogical staff at the State Armenian Pedagogical University (ASPU) after Khachatur Abovyan, where he delivered lectures on Special education. He also organized teachers' training programs. He was requested to initiate and to open a new department of Speech and Hearing Sciences at the State Armenian Pedagogical University (ASPU) after Khachatur Abovyan.
He participated in the International conferences as a speaker, majorly contributing on the issues connected to deaf education.  He is the author of Armenian Sign Language - Dictionary (study guide), 2001, Dictionary of Special Education (manual), 2001 and Talking hands –Armenian sign Language, Dictionary (study guide), 2004.

Monographs

Overview of publications 
 "Features of the development of attention of the deaf children"- "Sovetakan Mankavarjh" / "Soviet educator" /, journal № .9, p. 28-31, 1971.
 "Let us be attentive to them" - "Sovetakan dprots" / "Soviet school" /, newspaper, 28/04/ 1971.
 "How to check your child's hearing" - "Sovetakan dprots" / "Soviet school" /, newspaper, 9/02/1972.
 "A few words about the education of hearing impaired children" - "Sovetakan Mankavarjh" / "Soviet educator" /, journal № 7, p. 17-19, 1973.
  Armenian manual alphabet - miscellany "Deaf education", № .4, p. 56-58, 1973.
 "Literacy and learning items in Armenian school for hearing- impaired" –7th Scientific Session on deaf education, p. 162,1975.
 " Opinions, causes and consequences" - "Sovetakan dprots" / "Soviet school" /, newspaper, 29/05/1975.
 "Manual alphabet and sign language" -"Gitutyun ev technika" / "Science and Technology" /, journal № .12, p. 38-45, 1976.
 " Where to start the education for the deaf" -- "Sovetakan Mankavarjh" / "Soviet educator" /, journal № 2, p. 21-24, 979.
 "Special attitude to the special schools" - "Sovetakan dprots" / "Soviet school" /, newspaper, 15/05/1979.
 "Lip reading"- "Sovetakan Mankavarjh", / "Soviet educator" /, journal № 11, p. 71-72, 1980. 
 "Homework assignments in special boarding schools "- "Sovetakan dprots" / "Soviet school" /, newspaper, 7/01/1980. 
 "Peculiarities of the speech development of the deaf children" - "Sovetakan Mankavarjh" / "Soviet educator" /, journal № 4, p. 54-57, 1984.            
 "Special schools a way out from the impasse" - "Dprutyun" /ex. "Sovetakan dprots"/, / "Soviet school" /newspaper, 06/03/1990.
 "Talking Hands" - - "Yerevan", journal, 11/03/1991.
 "Educational or charity institution" - "Dprutyun" / ex. "Sovetakan dprots" / "Soviet school"/, newspaper, 04/06/1991.
 "Is Deaf education a science or not?" –“Hayastany Hanrapetutyun”,  /"Republic of Armenia"/, newspaper, 27/12/1992. 
 "Special education or inclusion?"-"Dprutyun" / ex. "Sovetakan dprots" /, "Soviet school", newspaper,  01-08/02/1996.
 "The system of special education and its problems" - "Dprutyun" / ex. "Sovetakan dprots" / "Soviet school" /, newspaper, 1996.
 "Issues for open discussion" -"Dprutyun" / ex. "Sovetakan dprots" / "Soviet school" /newspaper, 17/07/1996.
 "Training and education for the deaf in the United States”- "Dprutyun" / ex. "Sovetakan dprots" / "Soviet school" /, newspaper, 1-17/09/1996.
 "A retrospective view" - "Khaghagh Ashkharh" / "Peaceful World" /, 12/03/1991.
 "SES (special education specialists) for special schools" - "Dprutyun" / ex. "Sovetakan dprots" / "Soviet school"/, newspaper, 26/12/1991.
 "The problems of inclusion for deaf   - 3-rd International Scientific Conference on the item of "Supporting physical and mental development of children with disabilities in education, training and rehabilitation programs", Yerevan, 22-23/12/ 1995.
 "The issues of education for children with hearing impairment" – a thesis,   48th scientific conference in Yerevan, 1998.

Authored books 

 Armenian Sign Language - Dictionary (study guide), 2001.
 Dictionary of Special Education (manual), 2001.
 Talking hands –Armenian sign Language, Dictionary (study guide), 2004

See also
 Fingerspelling
 Sign language
 Armenian Sign Language

References 

1932 births
2004 deaths
People from Lori Province
Educators of the deaf
Armenian educators
20th-century linguists
Linguists of sign languages